Glacial Lake Iroquois was a prehistoric proglacial lake that existed at the end of the last ice age approximately 13,000 years ago.
The lake was essentially an enlargement of the present Lake Ontario that formed because the St. Lawrence River downstream from the lake was blocked by the ice sheet near the present Thousand Islands. The level of the lake was approximately 30 m  (~100 ft) above the present level of Lake Ontario.

The lake drained to the southeast, through a channel passing near present day Rome, New York. The Rome Sand Plains has several sand ridges that geologists think were formed at this time. The channel then followed the valley of the Mohawk River to the Hudson River.

The lake was fed by Early Lake Erie, as well as Glacial Lake Algonquin, an early partial manifestation of Lake Huron, that drained directly to Lake Iroquois across southern Ontario, along the southern edge of the ice sheet, bypassing Early Lake Erie.

The subsequent melting of the ice dam resulted in a sudden lowering of the lake to its present level, a potential trigger for the Younger Dryas episode.

Remnant shorelines
Two ancient shorelines in the Toronto area mark the existence of former glacial lakes. About 2 km inland from the shore, a ridge known as the Iroquois Shoreline can be discerned. The old shoreline runs west-east, running roughly parallel to Davenport Road just south of St. Clair Avenue West.  Further east, the Scarborough Bluffs also formed part of the shoreline of the ancient lake. In Mississauga, the shoreline is found south of Dundas Street and most visible with hills found east and west of Mavis Road.

Another ancient shoreline exists between 2–4 km offshore of Toronto. It is known as the Toronto Scarp and formed the shore of Glacial Lake Warren or Admiralty Lake. From Bluffer's Park in Scarborough to just west of Hanlan's Point is an underwater bluff.

In New York, Ridge Road and New York State Route 104 run from west to east along a ridge of the old shoreline of Lake Iroquois.

See also
Lake Agassiz
List of prehistoric lakes
Lake Coleman

References

External links
History of Lake Iroquois
Lake Iroquois and its shore cliff, showing map of the lake
Deglaciation of the Central St. Lawrence Lowland

Natural history of Ontario
Proglacial lakes
Geology of New York (state)
Glacial lakes of Canada